Nigel Alexander Dodds, Baron Dodds of Duncairn,  (born 20 August 1958), is a British unionist politician  who has  been the  Leader of the Democratic Unionist Party (DUP) in the House of Lords since 2021, and was the deputy leader of the DUP from 2008 to 2021.

Born in Derry and raised in County Fermanagh, Dodds originally practised as a barrister, and became Member of Parliament for the Belfast North constituency at the 2001 UK general election and served in that role until he was defeated by John Finucane of Sinn Féin in 2019.

Dodds has served in the past as a member of the Northern Ireland Assembly, and as Minister of Finance in the Northern Ireland Executive. In July 2020, he was nominated for a peerage in the House of Lords and announced in September 2020 that he would take the title Lord Dodds of Duncairn. He has been Lord Mayor of Belfast twice, and served as General Secretary of the DUP from 1993 to 2008.

Early life and career
Nigel Dodds was born in Derry, Northern Ireland. His father Joe was a long-standing Democratic Unionist Party (DUP) member of Fermanagh District Council until his death in 2008.

Raised in County Fermanagh, he was educated at Portora Royal School in Enniskillen, County Fermanagh, and studied law at St John's College, Cambridge, from which he graduated with a first-class degree, and where he won the university scholarship, McMahan studentship and Winfield Prize for Law. Upon graduation, he returned to Northern Ireland and, after studying at the Institute of Professional Legal Studies at Queen's University of Belfast, was called to the Bar of Northern Ireland. After working as a barrister, he worked at the Secretariat of the European Parliament from 1984 to 1996.

Politics
Dodds entered municipal politics in the 1981 local elections when he stood unsuccessfully for the Enniskillen part of Fermanagh District Council. Four years later in 1985, he was elected to Belfast City Council for the religiously and socially mixed Castle electoral area in the north of the city.

He attracted controversy when he and then DUP leader Ian Paisley attended a wake for Ulster Volunteer Force (UVF) leader John Bingham.

Dodds soon rose to prominence in the party. He was elected for two one-year terms as Lord Mayor of Belfast in June 1988 when he became the youngest ever Lord Mayor of Belfast aged 29 and June 1992 which was only surpassed when Niall Ó Donnghaile was elected as Lord Mayor in 2011 at the age of 25. In the same year, Dodds stood unsuccessfully for the East Antrim constituency in the Westminster election. He was elected to the Northern Ireland Forum in 1996, and topped the poll in Belfast North in all three elections to the reconstituted Northern Ireland Assembly in 1998, 2003 and 2007. He was awarded the OBE in 1997 for services to local government.

North Belfast had historically been strong territory for the DUP, Johnny McQuade representing the constituency in the British House of Commons from 1979 to 1983. The DUP stood down in favour of the Ulster Unionist Party in Westminster elections in the late 1980s and 1990s, in order to avoid splitting the unionist vote. Then, in 2001, Dodds challenged sitting Ulster Unionist Party (UUP) MP Cecil Walker, despite the danger of losing the mixed constituency to an Irish nationalist. Dodds won just over 40% of the overall vote and with that a 6,387 majority over Sinn Féin's Gerry Kelly, with the incumbent Walker being pushed into fourth place.

Dodds was Minister of Social Development in the Northern Ireland Executive from 21 November 1999 but resigned on 27 July 2000, then served again from 24 October 2001, when the devolved institutions were restored, until he was dismissed from office on 11 October 2002, shortly before the Executive and the Northern Ireland Assembly were collapsed by the UUP.

Dodds is vice-chair of the All Party Parliamentary Flag Group.

Dodds became Deputy Leader of the Democratic Unionist Party (DUP) in June 2008. He was appointed to the Privy Council of the United Kingdom on 9 June 2010, when he entered Westminster after the general election as the new party leader in parliament.

In April 2009, a leaked report showing MPs' expenses listed Dodds' with the highest expenses of any MP in Northern Ireland, ranking him 13th highest of all UK MPs.

In a 2012 Westminster debate on the issue of governance in association football, Dodds highlighted that footballers born in Northern Ireland often opt to play for the Republic of Ireland national football team instead, saying "action needs to be taken to stop the haemorrhaging of talent from Northern Ireland".

Paramilitary attacks
In December 1996 Dodds and his wife were the subjects of an attempted terrorist attack visiting their  sick son in the Royal Victoria Hospital, Belfast.  A police officer protecting them was injured in the attack. 

His constituency office was targeted by the Continuity IRA in 2003 when a viable improvised explosive device was left outside the office. The bomb was defused by British Army explosive experts.

12 July 2013 injury
At the Twelfth of July 2013 Orange order parades, Dodds was knocked unconscious at Woodvale Avenue in the Greater Shankill area of North Belfast by a brick thrown by fellow Ulster loyalists rioting against Police Service of Northern Ireland roadblocks. The violence broke out following the decision by the Parades Commission to bar Orangemen from walking past the Irish republican Ardoyne area. Dodds had been expelled from the House of Commons chamber by Speaker John Bercow for using unparliamentary language on 10 July 2013, after Dodds had refused to withdraw his accusation that the Conservative Secretary of State for Northern Ireland Theresa Villiers was being "deliberately deceptive" in answering questions about her powers in respect of what he called the "outrageous" Parades Commission ruling.

2017 onwards
Dodds said that the 2017 general election had "done more to maximise our influence" as it led to the DUP supporting a Conservative minority government. Arlene Foster together with Dodds set up the 'confidence-and-supply deal' with the Conservative Government; but relations with Theresa May have not always been smooth. Dodds opposed any attempts from the Republic of Ireland for 'annexation' of the north, and rejected the Brussels "Backstop option", stating it was tantamount to a surrender of sovereignty.

In January 2018, the Renewable Heat Incentive scandal made Dodds even more important to the government in Westminster, because the collapse of the Executive for the first time since 2002, was met with a deal for an extra £1 billion in funding for Northern Ireland. In June 2018, Dodds stated that "anything that would diminish the Union of the United Kingdom would be a clear red line for us."

In March 2019, Dodds was one of 21 MPs who voted against LGBT inclusive sex and relationship education in English schools.

He was defeated at the 2019 United Kingdom general election, losing his seat to Sinn Féin's John Finucane.

House of Lords
Dodds was nominated for a life peerage in Boris Johnson's 2019 Dissolution Honours and created Baron Dodds of Duncairn on 18 September 2020. He made his maiden speech in the House of Lords on 3 November 2020.

On 4 May 2021, Dodds announced that he would not seek re-election as deputy leader.

Personal life 
Dodds is married to DUP politician Diane Dodds; they have two sons and one daughter, and live in Banbridge, County Down.

References

External links
 Nigel Dodds OBE MP official constituency website
 
 

1958 births
Living people
Alumni of St John's College, Cambridge
Alumni of Queen's University Belfast
Barristers from Northern Ireland
People educated at Portora Royal School
Politicians from Derry (city)
Lord Mayors of Belfast
Members of Fermanagh District Council
Members of Belfast City Council
Members of the Bar of Northern Ireland
Members of the Northern Ireland Forum
Ministers of the Northern Ireland Executive (since 1999)
Ministers of Finance and Personnel of Northern Ireland
Democratic Unionist Party MLAs
Northern Ireland MLAs 1998–2003
Northern Ireland MLAs 2003–2007
Northern Ireland MLAs 2007–2011
Officers of the Order of the British Empire
Democratic Unionist Party MPs
Democratic Unionist Party life peers
Members of the Parliament of the United Kingdom for Belfast constituencies (since 1922)
Members of the Privy Council of the United Kingdom
UK MPs 2001–2005
UK MPs 2005–2010
UK MPs 2010–2015
UK MPs 2015–2017
UK MPs 2017–2019
Presbyterians from Northern Ireland
Life peers created by Elizabeth II